The Aero-Nut is a 1920 American two-reeler short comedy film starring Al St. John.  Only a three-minute fragment of the production's footage currently survives.

References

External links

 
 

1920 films
1920 comedy films
Silent American comedy films
1920 short films
American silent short films
American black-and-white films
1920s American films